Johnson Financial Group, Inc (est. in 1970) is the holding company of Johnson Bank and Johnson Insurance. Helen Johnson-Leipold, one of Samuel Curtis Johnson Jr.'s four children, serves as chairman of the company.

History
The company was founded in 1970 but wasn't incorporated until 1989 and has grown from a single bank holding company to a global organization providing a full range of financial services to businesses and individuals.

Johnson Financial Group, Inc. was formerly known as Johnson International, Inc. and changed its name to Johnson Financial Group, Inc. in January 2003. The company was incorporated in 1989 and is based in Racine, Wisconsin. It has banking locations in Wisconsin and Arizona.

Services
Johnson Financial Group, Inc. provides banking, wealth, and insurance products and services in Wisconsin and Arizona. It offers personal banking products and services, such as checking, saving, money market, health savings, and individual retirement accounts, as well as certificates of deposit; and personal loans, mortgage, and home equity solutions. The company also provides business banking solutions, including checking, savings, and money market accounts; and lending solutions that include commercial and term loans, commercial real estate financing, equipment leasing, and small business loans. In addition, it offers private banking, financial planning, trustee, estate administration, portfolio management, brokerage, and retirement planning services; and auto and recreation, home and condo, renters, umbrella, valuables, flood, life, long-term care, disability, health, identity theft, property and liability, professional and specialty liability, and risk management and loss prevention insurance solutions. Further, the company provides mobile banking, eBanking, credit cards, gift cards, treasury management, merchant card processing, and international banking services.

Subsidiaries

Selected domestic holdings
 Johnson Bank
 Johnson Insurance

External links
 Official Website

References

Financial services companies established in 1970
Companies based in Racine, Wisconsin
Holding companies established in 1989
Privately held companies based in Wisconsin
1989 establishments in Wisconsin
American companies established in 1989
American companies established in 1970
1970 establishments in Wisconsin